Palanga Rural District is in Shahrud District of Khalkhal County, Ardabil province, Iran. At the census of 2006, its population was 5,067 in 1,202 households; there were 5,619 inhabitants in 1,475 households at the following census of 2011; and in the most recent census of 2016, the population of the rural district was 5,000 in 1,549 households. The largest of its seven villages was Lerd, with 3,226 people.

References 

Khalkhal County

Rural Districts of Ardabil Province

Populated places in Ardabil Province

Populated places in Khalkhal County